Naytia glabrata is a species of sea snail, a marine gastropod mollusc in the family Nassariidae, the Nassa mud snails or dog whelks.

Description
The shell size varies between 7 mm and 10 mm.

Distribution
This species is distributed in the Atlantic Ocean off Senegal, Gabon and Angola.

References

 Bernard, P.A. (Ed.) (1984). Coquillages du Gabon [Shells of Gabon]. Pierre A. Bernard: Libreville, Gabon. 140, 75 plates pp
 Cernohorsky W. O. (1984). Systematics of the family Nassariidae (Mollusca: Gastropoda). Bulletin of the Auckland Institute and Museum 14: 1–356
 Adam W. & Knudsen J. 1984. Révision des Nassariidae (Mollusca : Gastropoda Prosobranchia) de l’Afrique occidentale. Bulletin de l'Institut Royal des Sciences Naturelles de Belgique 55(9): 1–95, 5 pl.
 Gofas, S.; Afonso, J.P.; Brandào, M. (Ed.). (S.a.). Conchas e Moluscos de Angola = Coquillages et Mollusques d'Angola. [Shells and molluscs of Angola]. Universidade Agostinho / Elf Aquitaine Angola: Angola. 140 pp

External links
 Sowerby G.B., II. (1842). Monograph of the genus Strombus. In G. B. Sowerby II (ed.), Thesaurus conchyliorum, or monographs of genera of shells. Vol. 1 (1): 25-39, pls 6-10. London, privately published.
 Galindo, L. A.; Puillandre, N.; Utge, J.; Lozouet, P.; Bouchet, P. (2016). The phylogeny and systematics of the Nassariidae revisited (Gastropoda, Buccinoidea). Molecular Phylogenetics and Evolution. 99: 337-353
 

Nassariidae
Gastropods described in 1842